Eared pheasants are pheasants from the genus Crossoptilon in the family Phasianidae.

Species
Established by Brian Houghton Hodgson in 1838, the genus contains four species:

All are large, sexually monomorphic and found in China.

References

Bird genera